Isaura Maenhaut van Lemberge (born 24 December 1998) is a Belgian sailor. She has competed in the 49 FX class at the 2020 Summer Olympics together with Anouk Geurts.

Career
Maenhaut started her career in the small Optimist class, competing in European and World championships for this youth category. She then progressed to the Laser 4.7 class, where she became Belgian champion. At the 2015 Youth World Championships in Medemblik, she won the bronze medal. In the next category, the Laser Radial, she again became Belgian champion.

Her first two-person competitions were with the Nacra 15 boat, which she sailed together with Henri Demesmaeker. Together they won the bronze medal at the 2016 Youth World Championships in Auckland. After a year in the Nacra 17 she then switched to the 49 FX.

Maenhaut and Geurts have sailed together since 2018. They finished 31st at the 2020 World Championships. They secured their Olympic ticket at the 2021 Lanzarote sailing competition.

Maenhaut lives in Merelbeke and studies nautical sciences.

Awards
2015: Young Sailor of the Year award from Belgian Sailing
2019: Sailing Team of the Year award from Belgian Sailing

Notes

External links
 
 
 
 

1998 births
Living people
Belgian female sailors (sport)
Olympic sailors of Belgium
Sailors at the 2020 Summer Olympics – 49er FX
People from Merelbeke
Sportspeople from East Flanders
21st-century Belgian women